Stephen Nickolas Belichick (January 7, 1919 – November 19, 2005) was an American football player, coach, and scout. He played college football at Western Reserve University, now known as Case Western Reserve University, from 1938 to 1940 and then in the National Football League (NFL) with the Detroit Lions in 1941. After serving in World War II, Belichick began his coaching career. From 1946 to 1949, he was the head football coach and the head basketball coach at Hiram College. He continued on as an assistant coach in college football with stints at Vanderbilt University (1949–1952), the University of North Carolina at Chapel Hill (1953–1955), and then for 34 years at the United States Naval Academy (1956–1989).

Belichick's son, Bill, is the current head coach of the NFL's New England Patriots. His grandsons, Stephen and Brian, serve as position coaches for the Patriots — outside linebackers and safeties, respectively.

Playing career
After graduation from Struthers High School, Belichick played college football at Western Reserve, now known as Case Western Reserve University, where he played at fullback.  Most notably, he was a member of the 1938 team, who went a perfect 9–0, and the bowl-qualifying 1940 team, where he scored several touchdowns in his senior season.  During the school's first and only bowl game, the 1941 Sun Bowl victory over Arizona State, he scored the first touchdown of the game.

After graduation, he worked as an equipment manager for the Detroit Lions. The team was struggling, and Belichick reportedly told the coach, Bill Edwards, "I can do better than most of the guys you've got." Edwards, who had coached Belichick at Western Reserve, agreed, and signed him as a player. Although the team's fortunes did not improve, Belichick had some success, scoring a 65-yard punt return touchdown in a loss against the New York Giants.

During a portion of his military time during World War II, Belichick played for the successful 1942 Great Lakes Navy Bluejackets football team.

Coaching and scouting career
In 1942, Belichick joined the United States Navy, serving in both Europe and the Pacific. After he completed his service in 1946, he became the head coach at Hiram College, southeast of Cleveland. In 1949, he left Hiram to become the backfield coach at Vanderbilt University, where he spent two seasons before joining the University of North Carolina as an assistant to George Barclay in 1953.  Both the Vanderbilt and North Carolina coaching jobs were alongside Belichick's former collegiate and professional head football coach, Bill Edwards.

In 1956, Belichick joined the United States Naval Academy staff under Eddie Erdelatz, where he served primarily as a scout for over 30 years. His book Football Scouting Methods (Ronald Press, 1962) became a standard, described by Charley Casserly as the best book on the subject he had read, and by Bleacher Report as the "Bible" of football scouting.

In 1982, Nick Saban was on the Navy football staff with Belichick.

Personal life
Steve Belichick was the youngest of five children born to Marija Barković and Ivan Biličić, who immigrated to the United States in 1897 from Draganić, Karlovac, Croatia and settled in Pennsylvania. After their marriage, the couple changed their names legally to Mary and John Belichick, reportedly at the suggestion of Immigration Center. In 1924, the family moved to Struthers, Ohio, where Steve Belichick maintained strong ties with the local Croatian community. In 1951, he married Jeannette Ruth Munn, with whom he had one child, Bill. Their son is currently the head coach of the New England Patriots and has cited his father, with whom he began analyzing game film at the age of 10, as his chief early influence.

Legacy
Located inside the Wyant Field House at DiSanto Field in Cleveland, the 4500-square foot Steve Belichick Varsity Weight Room is utilized by the Case Western Reserve Spartans football team.  Belichick was inducted into the Case Western Reserve University Athletics Hall of Fame for both football and basketball in 1976.

The Belichick Library on the campus of the United States Naval Academy was principally donated by Steve Belichick, and consists of books on football strategy and history, as well as Navy Football memorabilia.  His son has contributed to it in recent years, and it is considered one of the largest collections of football-related works outside of the Pro Football Hall of Fame.

Head coaching record

Football

References

External links
 
 

1919 births
2005 deaths
American football fullbacks
American men's basketball coaches
Case Western Spartans football players
Hiram Terriers football coaches
Hiram Terriers men's basketball coaches
Detroit Lions players
Great Lakes Navy Bluejackets football players
Navy Midshipmen football coaches
North Carolina Tar Heels football coaches
Vanderbilt Commodores football coaches
College men's basketball head coaches in the United States
United States Navy personnel of World War II
People from Struthers, Ohio
People from Monessen, Pennsylvania
Coaches of American football from Ohio
Players of American football from Pittsburgh
Players of American football from Ohio
Basketball coaches from Ohio
American people of Croatian descent
Belichick family